The Messenger is a 1918 American silent comedy film featuring Oliver Hardy.

Cast
 Billy West as Billy, the messenger boy
 Oliver Hardy (credited as Babe Hardy)
 Ethel Marie Burton
 Leatrice Joy
 Leo White
 Joe Bordeaux

Reception
Like many American films of the time, The Messenger was subject to cuts by city and state film censorship boards. For example, the Chicago Board of Censors cut, in Reel 1, four scenes of Billy looking at young woman with skirt raised exposing posterior and scene of Billy dropping trousers and standing in underwear.

See also
 List of American films of 1918
 Oliver Hardy filmography

References

External links

1918 films
1918 short films
American silent short films
American black-and-white films
1918 comedy films
Films directed by Arvid E. Gillstrom
Silent American comedy films
American comedy short films
1910s American films